Sir Robert George Wyndham Herbert,  (12 June 1831 – 6 May 1905), was the first Premier of Queensland, Australia. At 28 years and 181 days of age, he was the youngest person ever to be elected premier of an Australian state.

Early years
Born in Brighton, England, on 12 June 1831, Herbert was the only son of the Hon. Algernon Herbert, a younger son of the first Earl of Carnarvon. He was educated at Eton and Balliol College, Oxford. He won a Balliol scholarship in 1849 and, subsequently, the Hertford and Ireland scholarships. He took a first-class in Classical Moderations, won the Latin verse prize in 1852, and obtained second-class final honours in the classical school. He was elected Fellow of All Souls in 1854, and was Eldon law scholar. In 1855, he became private secretary to William Ewart Gladstone and was called to the bar of the Inner Temple in 1858.

Queensland colony
When Queensland was formed into a separate colony, Sir George Bowen was appointed the first governor. He arrived at Brisbane on 10 December 1859 and brought Herbert with him as his private secretary. On the day of the governor's arrival, Herbert was gazetted as colonial secretary, with Ratcliffe Pring as attorney-general. These with the governor formed an executive council to which additions were made afterwards. At the election held early in 1860, Herbert was returned unopposed for one of the Leichhardt seats in the Legislative Assembly of Queensland, and became the first Premier of Queensland. He showed himself to be a good leader and held office from December 1859 to February 1866.

During his time as Premier, four land acts were passed, and the education question was also the subject of early measures. The governor, in writing to the secretary of state, stated that the Queensland parliament "had passed a greater number of really useful measures than any other parliament in any of the Australian colonies". Certainly, the first Queensland government was in marked contrast to those of the other colonies, each of which averaged half a dozen ministries in the same period. However, Herbert fell into some disfavour when financial difficulties arose. He resigned in February 1866 and was succeeded by Arthur Macalister who served premier until 20 July 1866. Herbert was anxious to return to England on account of private business but, at the request of the governor, formed a ministry which lasted less than three weeks and was merged in the second Macalister ministry. Herbert then left for England, having gained the sort of experience which was to be very useful to him in later years.

Career in England
A few months after Herbert's arrival in England, he was appointed Assistant-Secretary to the Board of Trade. In 1870 was made Assistant Under-Secretary for the Colonies, while his relative, Henry Herbert, 4th Earl of Carnarvon, was the serving Secretary of State and, in 1871, became Permanent Under-Secretary of State for the Colonies. He held that position with great distinction for 21 years. In 1899/1900 he briefly took on the role as Acting Under-Secretary of State for the Colonies because of illness to Sir Edward Wingfield. His attitude was generally conciliatory and he was tactful in dealing with men who came in contact with him. 

In 1882, he was created K.C.B. and, in 1892, G.C.B. In the same year, he was appointed chancellor of the Order of St Michael and St George. He left the Colonial Office in 1892, but afterwards took up his duties again for a few months at the special request of Joseph Chamberlain. In 1893-6, he was agent-general for Tasmania, and did active work in connection with the formation of the British Empire League. In December 1903, he was chairman of the tariff commission.

Later years 
In later years, Robert Herbert suffered from heart trouble. Believing his health would benefit from a sea voyage, he went for a cruise in the Mediterranean. He met his sister in Marseilles, France, where his health worsened and he returned immediately to England. He was taken in an ambulance railway car on the Great Eastern Railway to his residence at Ickleton, Cambridgeshire, where he died on 6 May 1905.

Personal life

Robert Herbert met his companion, John Bramston, at Balliol College Oxford University, England in the early 1850s. The pair shared rooms at Oxford, and also in London. When Herbert was Premier of Queensland, and Bramston his Attorney-General, the two created a farm on what is now the site of the Royal Brisbane and Women's Hospital. They named the farmhouse in which they both lived "Herston", a combination of their names.

Herbert never married, and modern historians, such as Robert Aldrich and Garry Wotherspoon, conclude that he was likely gay. In 1864, Herbert gave this explanation as to why he had not married: "It does not seem to me reasonable to tell a man who is happy and content, to marry a woman who may turn out a great disappointment."

Legacy 
Herston became the name of a modern-day Brisbane suburb surrounding the site of the Royal Brisbane and Women's Hospital.

The Herbert River is located in Far North Queensland, Australia. The southernmost of Queensland's wet tropics river systems, it was named in 1864 by the explorer George Elphinstone Dalrymple after Robert Herbert.

The Queensland federal electorate of Herbert, one of the original 65 divisions contested at the first federal election, was named after him.

Governor George Bowen, Queensland's first Governor, appointed Sir Robert George Wyndham Herbert as first Colonial Secretary of Queensland before leaving England in 1859.  This document was ranked #5 in the ‘Top 150: Documenting Queensland’ exhibition when it toured to venues around Queensland from February 2009 to April 2010. The exhibition was part of Queensland State Archives’ events and exhibition program which contributed to the state’s Q150 celebrations, marking the 150th anniversary of the separation of Queensland from New South Wales.

See also

 Members of the Queensland Legislative Assembly, 1860–1863; 1863–1867

References

External links

1831 births
1905 deaths
Robert Herbert
Alumni of Balliol College, Oxford
Knights Grand Cross of the Order of the Bath
Members of the Queensland Legislative Assembly
Premiers of Queensland
Permanent Under-Secretaries of State for the Colonies
Civil servants in the Board of Trade
Civil servants in the Colonial Office
Private secretaries in the British Civil Service
High Sheriffs of the County of London
19th-century Australian politicians
19th-century Australian public servants
People educated at Eton College